Hampden South is a neighborhood in Denver, Colorado, United States.

History and development 
Much of the land was acquired in the 1860s by homesteader Rufus Clark, who amassed his fortune growing and selling potatoes to the influx of miners looking to make fortunes in the regional gold rush.  The neighborhood was annexed by the City of Denver in the 1960s and subsequently developed into a suburban neighborhood.

Today the neighborhood consists largely of 1960s-1970s era homes on some of the larger lots found in the city. The neighborhood also has three large parks – Southmoor, Rosamond, and Eastmoor – and nearby Cherry Creek State Park extends just to the east.

Demographics 
As of 2017, its population was 15,603 and had a median individual income of $41,650.

Businesses 
Sumitomo Corporation operates its Denver office in Suite 720 at 8055 East Tufts Avenue.

References

External links
 Southmoor Park South Neighborhood Association (formerly, Hampden South Neighborhood Association)

Neighborhoods in Denver